Mumtaz binti Md. Nawi is a Malaysian politician who has served as the Member of Parliament (MP) for Tumpat since November 2022. She currently serves as Kelantan State Executive Councillor.

Election Results

Honours 
  :
  Knight Commander of the Order of the Life of the Crown of Kelantan (DJMK) – Dato' (2019)

References

Living people
People from Kelantan
Malaysian people of Malay descent
Malaysian Muslims
Malaysian Islamic Party politicians
Members of the Kelantan State Legislative Assembly
Kelantan state executive councillors
21st-century Malaysian politicians
1972 births